Events in the year 2020 in Greenland.

Incumbents 

 Monarch – Margrethe II
 High Commissioner – Mikaela Engell
 Premier – Kim Kielsen

Events 
Ongoing — COVID-19 pandemic in Greenland

April 

 16 March – Greenland reports its first confirmed case of COVID-19, in Nuuk.
 14 September – Satellite imagery shows that a big chunk of ice shattered into many small pieces from the last remaining ice shelf in Nioghalvfjerdsfjorden, Greenland.

Sports 

 The 2020 Greenlandic Football Championship was cancelled due to the COVID-19 pandemic.

Deaths 

 21 July – Suka K. Frederiksen, 55, Greenlandic politician, Foreign Minister (2017–2018)
 15 October – Arnannguaq Høegh, 63, Greenlandic artist

References 

 
2020s in Greenland
Years of the 21st century in Greenland
Greenland
Greenland